Khalia Imani Lanier (born September 19, 1998) is an American professional volleyball player who plays as a outside hitter for Italian Series A1 team Volley Bergamo 1991. She played collegiately for the USC Trojans volleyball team, where she was an All-American outside hitter.

Personal life

Lanier was born and raised in Scottsdale, Arizona. She is the daughter of NBA Hall of Fame legend Bob Lanier. She chose to play volleyball over basketball, stating in an interview "I didn't want to play basketball because I didn't want to be in [her father's] spotlight."

She attended Xavier College Preparatory high school. She started her international volleyball career as a member of the 2011 USAV Future Select Team. She was part of the United States U18 Team and won a silver medal at the 2015 U18 World Championship. 

She was named the 2015–2016 Gatorade National Player of the Year in girl's volleyball, marking her the top high school volleyball player in the nation.

Career

College

Lanier played college volleyball for USC from 2016–2019. She majored in human biology and graduated from USC in the spring of 2020.

As a freshman in 2016, she received AVCA All-America honorable mention and was named to the AVCA All-Pacific South Region Team and the Pac-12 All-Conference and All-Freshman Team. She led the team and ranked second in the Pac-12 for points and was third in the Pac-12 for kills. She started in all 121 sets played for the team and finished with 491 kills, 315 digs and 47 blocks.

With the United States U20 Team, she was the captain of the gold medal winning team at the 2017 U-20 Pan American Cup, which marked the first time the U20 team earned a medal at the tournament. In the championship match versus Argentina, she led all players with 16 points.

As a sophomore in 2017, she serve as a team captain and was named an AVCA first-team All-American and was on the Pac-12 All-Conference Team. She finished her sophomore season with 511 kills and 578.5 points. She became the 17th player in USC program history to reach 1,000 career kills and only the second to do so in her first two seasons.

As a junior in 2018, she received AVCA All-America honorable mention honors and was on the Pac-12 All-Conference Team for the third straight season, after recording 457 kills and 511.0 points.

As a senior in 2019, she was an AVCA second team All-American. She was a finalist for the Senior CLASS Award in women's volleyball. She ended her career with 2,025 career kills, ranking sixth in the Pac-12 conference's history. She was only the fifth player in league history to collect 2,000 career kills and 1,000 career digs.

Professional clubs

  Pinkin de Corozal (2020–2021)
  Volley Bergamo 1991 (2020–)

Awards and honors

College

AVCA All-American (First Team in 2017; Second Team in 2019)
Pac-12 All-Conference (2016–2019)
Senior CLASS Award finalist in volleyball (2019)

External links
Italy Serie A1 profile

References

1998 births
Living people
Sportspeople from Scottsdale, Arizona
Opposite hitters
Outside hitters
American women's volleyball players
USC Trojans women's volleyball players
American expatriate sportspeople in Italy
Expatriate volleyball players in Italy
Serie A1 (women's volleyball) players
20th-century African-American people
21st-century African-American sportspeople
21st-century African-American women
African-American volleyball players